The 1962 Iowa gubernatorial election was held on November 6, 1962. Democratic nominee Harold Hughes defeated incumbent Republican Norman A. Erbe with 52.56% of the vote.

Primary elections
Primary elections were held on June 4, 1962.

Democratic primary

Candidates
Harold Hughes, Chairman of the State Commerce Commission
Lewis E. Lint

Results

Republican primary

Candidates
Norman A. Erbe, incumbent Governor
William H. Nicholas, former Lieutenant Governor

Results

General election

Candidates
Harold Hughes, Democratic 
Norman A. Erbe, Republican

Results

References

1962
Iowa
Gubernatorial